Syedra is a genus of sheet weavers that was first described by Eugène Louis Simon in 1884.

Species
 it contains seven species, found in Europe and the Middle Africa:
Syedra apetlonensis Wunderlich, 1992 – Austria, Slovakia, Norway, Russia
Syedra gracilis (Menge, 1869) (type) – Europe, Turkey
Syedra myrmicarum (Kulczyński, 1882) – Central Europe
Syedra nigrotibialis Simon, 1884 – France (Corsica)
Syedra oii Saito, 1983 – China, Korea, Japan
Syedra parvula Kritscher, 1996 – Malta
Syedra scamba (Locket, 1968) – Congo

See also
 List of Linyphiidae species (Q–Z)

References

Araneomorphae genera
Linyphiidae
Spiders of Africa
Spiders of Asia